Karen Lee may refer to:

Karen Lee (swimmer) (born 1983), British Olympic swimmer
Karen Lee (politician) (born 1959), Former British Labour Party MP for Lincoln
Karen An-hwei Lee (born 1973), Chinese-American poet

See also

Karen Li (born 1977), New Zealand table tennis player